This is a list of Croatian television related events from 1959.

Events

Debuts

Television shows

Ending this year

Births
7 March - Zijad Gračić, actor

Deaths